Convention on Certain Conventional Weapons – Group of Governmental Experts on Lethal Autonomous Weapons Systems refers to a group of experts created by the United Nations in order to study legal, ethical, societal and moral questions that arise from the increased use of autonomous robots to carry weapons and to be programmed to engage in combat in various situations that might arise, including battles between countries, or in patrolling border areas or sensitive areas, or other similar roles.

See also
 Robot
 Robotics

References

External links
 Official UN Website

Robotics